Barchords is the second album from Canadian musician Bahamas.

The album was nominated for Adult Alternative Album of the Year at the Juno Awards of 2013.

Track listing
All songs written by Afie Jurvanen.

References

2012 albums
Bahamas (musician) albums
Brushfire Records albums